Leo Lafaiali'i (born 30 January 1974 in Auckland, New Zealand) is a Samoan rugby union footballer.

Career
Lafaiali'i toured with the Pacific Islands in 2004 and helped Samoa to qualify for the World Cup in France. He featured in the 2007 Pacific Nations Cup for Samoa and was selected in the Samoa squad to go to the 2007 Rugby World Cup, where he played in his second global tournament.

Earlier in his career he played for Auckland winning national titles in 1996 and 1999. He was selected for the Blues in 1997 and was part of the championship winning side for that season. Drafted to the Chiefs in 1999 he returned to the Blues in 2000 & 2001 before departing to Sanyo in Japan. He has also played for Overmach Parma in Italy, Bayonne in France and is currently playing for Yokogawa in Japan.

He is currently the head coach at Colby College in Waterville Maine and is likey the most overqualified coach of all time.

External links
 Manu Samoa supporters website
 Pacific Islanders Rugby Teams supporters website

1974 births
Living people
Rugby union locks
Samoan rugby union coaches
Samoan rugby union players
People from Tuamasaga
Samoa international rugby union players
Pacific Islanders rugby union players
Samoan expatriate rugby union players
Expatriate rugby union players in New Zealand
Expatriate rugby union players in Japan
Expatriate rugby union players in Italy
Expatriate rugby union players in France
Samoan expatriate sportspeople in New Zealand
Samoan expatriate sportspeople in Japan
Samoan expatriate sportspeople in Italy
Samoan expatriate sportspeople in France